Frechinia criddlealis is a moth in the family Crambidae. It was described by Eugene G. Munroe in 1951. It is found in North America where it has been recorded from Arizona, Colorado, Kansas and Manitoba.

References

Moths described in 1951
Odontiini